Qaleh Meydan or Qaleh-i-Maidan or Qaleh-ye Meydan or Qallah-i-Maidan may refer to:
 Qaleh-ye Meydan, Khuzestan
 Qaleh Meydan, Razavi Khorasan